Eustachys glauca, the saltmarsh fingergrass, is a species of grass native to the southeastern United States.

This perennial grass grows up to 4 feet tall. The dark green, folded leaf blades are 12 to 14 inches long and have rounded tips. The ligule is a tiny fringe of hairs. The seedhead is made up of 15 to 20 long spikes, each up to 5 centimeters long. The brown spikelets are arranged along one side of each spike. The grass grows for a long time during the year and may produce 2 or more crops of seed in a season.

This grass grows in coastal habitat, such as marsh land and sloughs. It prefers calcareous soils.

This grass provides a good graze for livestock, but overgrazing will kill it.

References

External links
USDA Plants Profile

Chloridoideae
Grasses of the United States
Flora of the Southeastern United States
Taxa named by Alvan Wentworth Chapman